Kill My Blues is the second solo album by Corin Tucker (of Sleater-Kinney) and her band, released on September 18, 2012 by Kill Rock Stars.

Background and recording
According to Rolling Stone, "...her band also made Kill My Blues a more collaborative effort than its predecessor. Instead of Tucker bringing in finished songs, she jammed out ideas in a rehearsal space with drummer Sara Lund, guitarist Seth Lorinczi and bassist Mike Clark." As Tucker herself puts it on the Kill Rock Stars website, "After the past two years playing together, traveling and making music, I think we’re more comfortable," and "We collaborated on every song on this record and no one was shy about their ideas. I think you can hear that sense of joy and abandon in the songs."

Reception
The album received mostly positive reviews, in particular from Robert Christgau, a longtime fan of Sleater-Kinney, who gave it an A−. In addition, Blurt was very positive, giving it a 9 out of 10 and saying "This follow-up is even better & louder [than 1000 Years], on par with the dizzying heights of her old band." This Is Fake DIY was less enthusiastic, giving the album a score of 6 out of 10 and saying, "Instead of killing her blues, perhaps Corin Tucker needs to embrace them." Likewise, Consequence of Sound found the album lacking, giving it a C− grade and saying that on it, "Most of the time, though, the rage in her voice mismatches with the overly glammy, sleek material, lacking the wildness that made her first band so important."

Promotion
The album was promoted by a tour lasting from September 13 to October 13, starting in Minneapolis and ending in her hometown of Portland, Oregon.

Track listing
Groundhog Day - 2:29
Kill My Blues - 3:58
Neskowin - 4:34
I Don't Wanna Go - 2:41
Constance - 3:49
No Bad News Tonight - 2:05
Summer Jams - 4:20
None Like You - 4:11
Joey - 4:28	
Outgoing Message - 2:15	
Blood, Bones, and Sand - 3:06
Tiptoe - 3:40

Personnel
Sara Lund – drums
Mike Clark – bass
Seth Lorinczi – engineer, guitar, keyboards, producer
Robin Clark – artwork, design

Charts

References

External links
Kill My Blues at Allmusic
Kill My Blues at Discogs
Kill My Blues at Metacritic

2012 albums
Corin Tucker albums
Kill Rock Stars albums